Ryu Kum-chel is a manhwa (Korean comics) artist from Daejeon, South Korea. His representative works are Ares, Nephilim, and King Muryeong. According to a manhwa critic, Lee Seung-nam's review of Ares in 2004, Ryu showed a mature style and presentation as opposed to his short career as a manhwa artist.

References

External links
Official fan site

South Korean manhwa artists
Year of birth missing (living people)
Living people
People from Daejeon